Adolfo Atilio Gilly Malvagni (born 1928) is an author of various books on the history of and politics of Mexico and Latin America and professor of History and Political Science at the School of Social and Political Sciences at the Universidad Nacional Autónoma de México in Mexico City where he has been teaching since 1979. He is well known for his prolific articles in La Jornada (a major Mexican newspaper). His research particularly focuses on globalization and the Zapatista movement centered in the southeast state of Chiapas, México.

Biography 

Professor Gilly obtained a B.A. in Social Science and Law during his time living in Buenos Aires, Argentina and in 1994 he completed his Ph.D. in Latin America Studies with emphasis in political science at the UNAM where he currently teaches. Gilly currently lives in the upper middle-class district of Coyoacán, Mexico City. He has been a visiting scholar at numerous universities including Yale University, UC Berkeley, Stanford University, University of Chicago, University of Maryland, and Columbia University. Some of his works have been translated into English, Japanese, Portuguese, and French. He is currently a full-time professor at the UNAM where he teaches at the School of Graduate Studies. Dr. Gilly was Chief Advisor to the Office of Mexico City's Mayor (Cuauhtemoc Cardenas) from 1997-2000.

References

1928 births
Living people
Argentine people of Italian descent
Argentine emigrants to Mexico
Naturalized citizens of Mexico
Latin Americanists
20th-century Mexican historians
Historians of Mexico
National Autonomous University of Mexico alumni
Academic staff of the National Autonomous University of Mexico